Celebrity Rehab Presents Sober House, or simply Sober House, is a VH1 reality television show. It was a spin-off of Celebrity Rehab with Dr. Drew, and premiered on January 15, 2009.

Production
Sober House is a continuation of Celebrity Rehab, in which celebrities with substance addictions transition from a drug-rehabilitation center to a less structured, drug-free, sober living home, which is housed in a mansion in the Hollywood Hills. The facility, at which the recovering addicts stay for 30 days, is run by House Manager Jennifer Gimenez and rehab tech Will Smith, a former stuntman. Bob Forrest serves as the head counselor. Dr. Drew Pinsky provides outpatient counseling to the recovering addicts during their time in the house.

The production employs a camera crew for each cast member. Producers filmed 2,500 to 3,000 hours of footage for the nine 43-minute episodes of the first season. The camera crews are instructed not to interfere with the cast, but to alert producers if they observe unsafe behavior. This policy is what led to the calling the police on Steven Adler during the first season.

As with Celebrity Rehab, the cast members are paid for their appearance on the show.

Pinsky announced in December 2010 that he has stopped production of future seasons of Sober House, as it was deemed too intrusive, and interfered with the treatment plan.

Recurring cast
Casts for individual seasons are seen in sections for those seasons.

Jennifer Gimenez - The House Manager of the sober living facility. She is a model and actress, and a recovering addict herself, who first met Season 2 resident Tom Sizemore four years previously when they were both in treatment for substance abuse.
Dr. Drew Pinsky - MD, addiction specialist.
Bob Forrest - The Head Counselor during group sessions. He is also Chemical Dependency Program Director at Las Encinas Hospital.
Will Smith - A Rehab Technician described as the "muscle" of the facility. He is also a recovering addict.
Loesha Zeviar - A Resident Technician at the Pasadena Recovery Center who first appeared in the second season of Celebrity Rehab. She shows up at Jennifer's house in the sixth episode of Season 2 to assist her. Pinsky has referred to her as one of the strongest staff members at the PRC.
Shirley Bennet The facility manager at the Pasadena Recovery Center. She first appeared on Celebrity Rehab, and appears in Season 2, episode 7.
Dr. Charles Sophy - psychiatrist and director of the Los Angeles County Department of Children and Family Services. He is also the author of Side By Side The Revolutionary Mother-Daughter Program for Conflict-Free Communication, and is the lead psychiatrist of the Celebrity Rehab and Sober House production team. Although he only appears occasionally, he was present throughout the filming of the second season.

Reception
Andy Dehnart of Reality Blurred called the series "more harrowing, compelling, and entertaining" than its parent show. Producer John Irwin said that Sober House is "more compelling than Celebrity Rehab. It really is where the real work begins with these guys."

Season 1

Season 2
The second season of Celebrity Rehab Presents Sober House premiered March 11, 2010. The five alumni of Celebrity Rehab 3 arrived at the sober living facility one week after completing their drug rehab treatment depicted during that series.

Note: In the synopses, house manager Jennifer Gimenez is referred to as "Jennifer", while patient Jennie Ketcham will be referred to as "Jennie", as that is the diminutive that Ketcham herself and others use to refer to her.

References

External links
 
 

2000s American reality television series
2009 American television series debuts
2010s American reality television series
2010 American television series endings
American television spin-offs
English-language television shows
Television shows set in Los Angeles
Reality television spin-offs
VH1 original programming